Bloody Bones is a bogeyman figure in English and North American folklore. The character is sometimes called Rawhead, Tommy Rawhead, or Rawhead-and-Bloody-Bones (with or without the hyphens).

Origins
The Oxford English Dictionary cites approximately 1548 as the earliest written appearance of "Bloodybone". The term "Raw-Head and Bloody-Bones, and such other Names" was used "to awe children, and keep them in subjection", as recorded by John Locke in 1693.  Samuel Johnson in his Dictionary of the English Language (first published in 1755) defined "Rawhead" as "the name of a spectre, mentioned to fright children".  The stories originated in Great Britain where they were particularly common in Lancashire and Yorkshire, and spread to North America where the stories were common in the Southern United States.

Folklore
Bloody Bones is sometimes regarded as a water demon haunting deep ponds, oceans, and old marl pits (which often became filled with water to form ponds) where it dragged children into the depths, much like the grindylow and Jenny Greenteeth. Children were told to "keep away from the marl-pit or rawhead and bloody bones will have you."

Ruth Tongue said in Somerset Folklore that he "lived in a dark cupboard, usually under the stairs.  If you were heroic enough to peep through a crack you would get a glimpse of the dreadful, crouching creature, with blood running down his face, seated waiting on a pile of raw bones that had belonged to children who told lies or said bad words. If you peeped through the keyhole he got you anyway."

Old Bloody Bones is a Cornish version of Rawhead-and-Bloody-Bones according to F. W. Jones in Old Cornwall. Old Bloody Bones inhabited Knockers Hole near the village of Baldhu. There was said to have been a massacre in the area, and it is suggested that he was a ghost or evil spirit attracted by the carnage.

In the Southern United States, Rawhead and Bloody Bones are sometimes regarded as two individual creatures or two separate parts of the same monster. One is a skull stripped of skin that bites its victims (Rawhead) and its companion is a dancing headless skeleton (Bloody Bones). In one cautionary tale a gossip loses his head to the monster as punishment for his wicked tongue. Legends about Bloody Bones eventually made their way into African-American tradition as well as spreading to other parts of the United States.<ref>"Bloody Bones: A History of Southern Scares" Deep South Magazine</ref> There are numerous references to "Raw Head and Bloody Bones" in the WPA slave narratives.

In popular culture
"Rawhead and Bloody Bones" is a song from the album Peepshow by English rock band Siouxsie and the Banshees.

In the start of episode 12 in the first season of TV series Supernatural, Sam and Dean are fighting a rawhead.

The Anita Blake book "Bloody Bones," a Novel by Laurell K. Hamilton, also deals with a version of Rawhead and Bloody Bones.Rawhead Rex is a movie set in Ireland where Rawhead is unleashed on the countryside.

A rawhead shows up in the first chapters of the Dresden Files novel Cold Days''.

References

External links
 A variation on the character from the Southern USA:  Raw Head and Bloody Bones retold by S. E. Schlosser

16th-century neologisms
English folklore
English legendary creatures
Cornish legendary creatures
Fairies
American legendary creatures
Folklore of the Southern United States
European ghosts
Water spirits
Bogeymen
Demons